Good Boy Bad Boy is a 2007 Indian Hindi-language comedy film directed by Ashwini Chaudhary, starring Emraan Hashmi, Tusshar Kapoor, Tanushree Dutta, Isha Sharvani and Paresh Rawal. It is Produced by Raju Farooqui under the banner of Mukta Arts Ltd, and is a remake of the 1992 film Class Act starring Kid 'N Play. This film marks the third collaboration between the lead actors Tanushree Dutta and Emraan Hashmi after Aashiq Banaya Aapne and Chocolate.

Plot
Raju Malhotra and Rajan Malhotra study in the same college but are poles apart in every trait. While Raju is a brat, poor in studies but good in sports, Rajan is a brilliant student but a zero in extracurricular activities. The college they study in has a new and strict principal Mr. Awasthi who wants to transform this ill-reputed college into a most flocked one. Hence he divides the students according to their merit. So while Raju is fit for C section, for poorly faring students, Rajan easily gets access to the A section with his 90% marks. But Raju falls for a girl in A-section and hence swaps his place with a hesitant Rajan who enters C-section for the first time in his life. Mr. Awasthi learns of this and retaliates by sending their names to a quiz and dance competition. So now, geeky Rajan will have to dance while brat Raju will have to answer questions hurled at him. What will Raju and Rajan do? Will they accept the challenge or just scoot off?

Cast
 Emraan Hashmi as Rajveer "Raju" Malhotra 
 Tusshar Kapoor as Rajan Malhotra 
 Tanushree Dutta as Dinky Kapur
 Isha Sharvani as Rashmi Awasthi
 Paresh Rawal as Principal Diwanchand "Diwan" Awasthi
 Manu Malik as Raj Basra
 Rakesh Bedi as Mr. Prem Malhotra
 Navni Parihar as Mrs. Prem Malhotra
 Anang Desai as Mr. P.K. Malhotra
 Prabha Sinha as Mrs. P.K. Malhotra
 Kabir Sadanand as Willyboy
 Sushmita Mukherjee as Prof. Bebo Chatterjee
 Jennifer Mayani as Jenny
 Ambika Chaudhary as Deepti Talpade
 Rajesh Balwani as Philosophy teacher
 Nazzar Abdulla as Psychology teacher
 Amita Chandekar as Prof. Julie
 Ghanshyam Garg as Fakira
 Ajay Thakur
 Anuj Gill
 Punit Aneja
 Ajay Dixit
 Abhishek Rawat
 Tarul Swami

Soundtrack 

All music was composed by Himesh Reshammiya. Lyrics penned by Sameer, Music Label: Tips Industries

References

External links 
 

2007 films
Films scored by Himesh Reshammiya
2000s Hindi-language films
Indian comedy films
Indian remakes of American films
2007 comedy films